Christopher is a city in Franklin County, Illinois, United States. The population was 2,382 at the time of the 2010 census.

History

Christopher was founded in 1879 as a railroad stop, and named for Christopher Harrison, a grandson of prominent early settler Isham Harrison. A post office opened the following year. The community voted to become a village in 1903, and a city in 1910.

Coal mining
In 1906, the United Coal Mining Company No. 1 mine opened near Christopher. An explosion at the mine killed eight men on July 27, 1915. The mine was sold to the Old Ben Coal Corporation, and renamed Old Ben Coal Mine No. 1 in 1916. The mine closed in 1929.

On November 29, 1917, an explosion at Old Ben Coal Corporation's Mine No. 11 killed 17 men.

Mob vigilantism during World War I
On March 22, 1918, five men who were accused of being "pro-German" became victims of a mob numbering more than 300 people. They were:

 Theodore Kunger, a grocer, had been judged by a local court of being disloyal, and ordered to pay a $100 fine. Having no money, he was put in jail. Later his cell was broken into by a vigilance committee. Kunger was carried by the mob to the city square where he was made to kiss the U.S. flag before he was tarred and feathered. He was then returned to jail.
 W. R. Jones, Kunger's attorney, was abducted five miles outside Christopher on his way home to Benton, Illinois. He was brought to the square and compelled to kiss the flag and praise president Woodrow Wilson, but was spared tar and feathers. He was told to leave town.
 Henry Timbrock and Henry Wheeler were also suspected of pro-German sympathies. They too were taken to the square, made to kiss the flag and tarred and feathered.
 The Polish pastor of the local Catholic church, Rev. John Kovalsky, had been accused of making disloyal remarks. He was taken to the square where he was stripped to the waist and coated with tar and feathers.

Geography
Christopher is located 20 miles northeast of Carbondale, Illinois at  (37.972099, -89.052911).

Demographics

As of the census of 2000, there were 2,836 people, 1,297 households, and 814 families residing in the city. The racial makeup of the city was 98.62% White, 0.11% African American, 0.04% Native American, 0.28% Asian, 0.11% from other races, and 0.85% from two or more races. Hispanic or Latino of any race were 0.53% of the population.

There were 1,297 households, out of which 25.3% had children under the age of 18 living with them, 46.6% were married couples living together, 11.5% had a female householder with no husband present, and 37.2% were non-families. 34.5% of all households were made up of individuals, and 19.8% had someone living alone who was 65 years of age or older. The average household size was 2.19 and the average family size was 2.79.

In the city the population was spread out, with 21.8% under the age of 18, 8.2% from 18 to 24, 24.2% from 25 to 44, 24.3% from 45 to 64, and 21.5% who were 65 years of age or older. The median age was 42 years. For every 100 females, there were 86.3 males. For every 100 females age 18 and over, there were 85.3 males.

The median income for a household in the city was $25,045, and the median income for a family was $34,342. Males had a median income of $30,222 versus $18,458 for females. The per capita income for the city was $15,141. About 14.3% of families and 19.8% of the population were below the poverty line, including 34.4% of those under age 18 and 9.5% of those age 65 or over.

Education
Rend Lake College
John A. Logan College
Southern Illinois University Carbondale

Notable people 

 Doug Collins, former NBA player and coach
 Al Glossop, second baseman for the New York Giants, Boston Bees, Philadelphia Phillies, Brooklyn Dodgers and Chicago Cubs
 Louie E. Lewis, Illinois state treasurer and speaker of the Illinois House of Representatives
 John Malkovich, actor, producer, and director
 Gene Rayburn (1917–99), radio and television personality, known for hosting the Match Game

References

Cities in Franklin County, Illinois
Populated places in Southern Illinois
Cities in Illinois
Tarring and feathering in the United States